Stephen Christopher Howard (born July 15, 1970) is an American former professional basketball player in the National Basketball Association (NBA). He was born and raised in Dallas, Texas, and played college basketball at DePaul University from 1988 to 1992. He was an Academic All-American his junior and senior years. He was a team captain his senior year, and finished his career at DePaul in fifth place all time for scoring and rebounding. He also holds the school record for most free throw made in a career. He was undrafted in the 1992 NBA draft, but accepted an invitation to try out for the Utah Jazz. He made the roster and played power forward for the Jazz in 1992–1993, and then again in 1995 and 1998. He played for the San Antonio Spurs in 1996–1997, and for the Seattle SuperSonics in 1997–1998. He continued to play professionally overseas for the next ten years, competing in 12 different countries. He completed his professional career in 2008.

During the 1998–99 NBA lockout, Howard opened a juice store with some friends in Northern Dallas called "Acappella", where people could get 25% off their final bill during weekends, if they sang 10 seconds from their favorite song aloud at the counter.

References
Citations

External links
NBA stats @ basketballreference.com

1970 births
Living people
African-American basketball players
ALM Évreux Basket players
American expatriate basketball people in France
American expatriate basketball people in Greece
American expatriate basketball people in Israel
American expatriate basketball people in Italy
American expatriate basketball people in Lebanon
American expatriate basketball people in the Philippines
American expatriate basketball people in Saudi Arabia
American expatriate basketball people in Spain
American expatriate basketball people in Turkey
American men's basketball players
Anadolu Efes S.K. players
Apollon Patras B.C. players
Baloncesto Málaga players
Basketball players from Dallas
Capitanes de Arecibo players
DePaul Blue Demons men's basketball players
Gijón Baloncesto players
Hapoel Jerusalem B.C. players
Idaho Stampede (CBA) players
Liga ACB players
Oklahoma City Cavalry players
Olimpia Basket Pistoia players
Pallacanestro Trapani players
Paris Racing Basket players
San Antonio Spurs players
San Miguel Beermen players
Seattle SuperSonics players
Small forwards
Undrafted National Basketball Association players
Utah Jazz players
Sta. Lucia Realtors players
Sagesse SC basketball players
21st-century African-American sportspeople
20th-century African-American sportspeople